Al Anwa Aviation is a charter airline based out of Riyadh, Saudi Arabia. As of 2013 it was one of seven Saudi-based airline companies.

Fleet
The Al Anwa fleet consisted of the following aircraft (as of August 2016):

Retired
Al Anwa has also operated the following:

1 – Lockheed L-1011 TriStar 500

References

External links
 Al Anwa website

Companies with year of establishment missing
Airlines of Saudi Arabia
Charter airlines
Companies based in Riyadh
Transport in Riyadh